The West Ham Hammers were a  speedway team, first promoted by Jimmy Baxter in 1929.

History 
They operated from the West Ham Stadium until the outbreak of World War II  under several different promotions, most successfully under the control of Johnnie Hoskins.

The track opened in 1928 and staged a few meetings during the early war years.

Meetings were staged in 1945 but the Hammers re-opened in 1946 and ran until 1955. However dwindling crowds saw the promotion close. It did not re-open until 1964. The West Ham team were the inaugural winners of the British League in 1965, under a promotion fronted by former rider Tommy Price. Dave Lanning became promoter in 1966, and West Ham ran for a further six seasons until 1971 when they were informed that the stadium was being sold by the Greyhound Racing Association to make way for building development. The Romford Bombers moved into the stadium for the 1972 season, racing under the name West Ham Bombers.

As the original West Ham team folded in the speedway British League Division One, at the end of the 1971 season, the prospect of racing at the famous Custom House Stadium, albeit with a "nomad" team, delighted the local populace, and attendances at Custom House for the Bombers were very healthy.  However, uncertainty dogged the promotion, with always the prospect of the stadium being sold from underneath them at short notice, and after just 6 home meetings (with the Bombers maintaining a healthy league position), the plug was pulled and the last speedway meeting at West Ham Stadium was held on 23 May 1972, with West Ham .v. Hull.  The West Ham Bombers lost the match 38-40, with the last league race (heat 13) won by Hull's Tony Childs. West Ham's Kevin Holden was the winner of the last race, the second-half Finale, to finally complete a long and sad disintegration of the sport at one of the world's most famous venues. The stadium was demolished later that year and the site redeveloped for housing. The roads on the new estate were all named after former West Ham riders, mostly from the 1930s, 1940s and 1950s.

Riders

"Top 20"
The top twenty West Ham riders as voted in Speedway '72 magazine published in 1972. 
*
*

Season summary

+4th when league suspended

References

External links
Aerial photograph of West Ham Stadium
West Ham Hammers website

Defunct British speedway teams
Speedway teams in London
Sports clubs established in 1929
Sports clubs disestablished in 1972